The Arab is a 1915 American silent adventure film directed by Cecil B. DeMille. Edgar Selwyn wrote and starred in the Broadway play version of the story in 1911, and this film is based on that play.  Selwyn reprises his role from his play. This film was refilmed by Metro Pictures in 1924 as The Arab. The film is now lost.

Cast
 Edgar Selwyn as Jamil
 Horace B. Carpenter as The Sheik
 Milton Brown as Abdullah
 William Elmer as Meshur (as Billy Elmer)
 Sydney Deane as Dr. Hilbert
 Gertrude Robinson as Mary Hilbert
 J. Parks Jones as Ibrahim (as Park Jones)
 Theodore Roberts as Turkish Governor
 Raymond Hatton as Mysterious Messenger
 Irvin S. Cobb as American Tourist
Marjorie Daw as Village Girl

References

External links

1915 films
1915 adventure films
1915 lost films
American adventure films
American black-and-white films
American silent feature films
Films directed by Cecil B. DeMille
Lost American films
Lost adventure films
1910s American films
Silent adventure films
1910s English-language films